Bombus californicus, the California bumble bee, is a species of bumble bee in the family Apidae. Bombus californicus is in the subgenus Thoracobombus. It is found in Central America and the western half of North America.
Bombus californicus is classified as Vulnerable by the IUCN.

In a 2015 study, Bombus californicus was found to be endangered in 62% of surveyed areas.

Bombus californicus can exhibit multiple possible color patterns of yellow and black, as in its sister species Bombus fervidus, and in many areas of geographic overlap, at least a small percentage of individuals of the two species cannot be recognized except by genetic analysis, as each species can sometimes display the color pattern typical of the other. The "typical" color pattern of female californicus is black with only a single strong yellow band anteriorly on the thorax, and another single yellow band near the apex of the abdomen; males exhibit considerably more variation.

Bombus californicus nests in the ground, in wooded areas, and in urban areas. Queens emerge from April through the middle of July. Workers are present from April to September. Males (drones) are present late May through September. This type of bumblebee pollinates sage, blueberry bushes, red clover, california poppies, and many other species of flowers.

References

Further reading

External links

 

Bumblebees
Articles created by Qbugbot
Insects described in 1854